This is list of elections in Canada in 2002. Included are provincial, municipal and  federal elections, by-elections on any level, referendums and party leadership races at any level.

March
23: Progressive Conservative Party of Ontario leadership election

April
15: Quebec provincial by-elections

May
15: British Columbia aboriginal treaty referendum

June
17: Quebec provincial by-elections

October
23: Manitoba municipal election
23: Winnipeg municipal election

November
3: Bromont municipal election
3: Cowansville municipal election
3: Quebec municipal elections
4: Yukon general election

December
1: Magog municipal election

See also
Municipal elections in Canada
Elections in Canada